Below is a list of the endangered and threatened animal and plant species in the Commonwealth of Virginia, United States.

Animals

Mammals
 Gray bat (Myotis grisescens)
 Indiana bat (Myotis sodalis)
 Virginia big-eared bat
 West Indian manatee (Trichechus manatus)
 Dismal Swamp southeastern shrew (Sorex longirostris fisheri)
 Fin whale (Balaenoptera physalus)
 Humpback whale (Megaptera novaeangliae))

Birds
 Piping plover (Charadrius melodus)
 Roseate tern (Sterna dougallii dougallii)
 Red-cockaded woodpecker (Picoides borealis)
 Kirtland’s warbler (Dendroica kirtlandii)

Reptiles
 Green sea turtle (Chelonia mydas)
 Hawksbill turtle (Eretmochelys imbricata)
 Kemp's ridley (Lepidochelys kempii)
 Leatherback sea turtle (Dermochelys coriacea)
 Loggerhead sea turtle (Caretta caretta)
 Bog turtle (Clemmys muhlenbergii)

Fish
 Slender chub (Erimystax cahni)
 Spotfin chub (Cyprinella monacha)
 Duskytail darter (Etheostoma percnurum)
 Roanoke logperch (Percina rex)
 Shortnose sturgeon (Acipenser brevirostrum)
 Blackside dace (Phoxinus cumberlandensis)
 Yellowfin madtom (Noturus flavipinnis)

Insects
 Northeastern beach tiger beetle (Cicindela dorsalis dorsalis)
 Mitchell’s satyr (Neonympha mitchellii)

Crustaceans
 Lee County cave isopod (Lirceus usdagalun)
 Madison cave isopod (Antrolana lira)

Gastropods
 Virginia fringed mountain snail (Polygyriscus virginianus)

Bivalves
 Purple bean (Villosa perpurpurea)
 Cumberlandian combshell (Epioblasma brevidens)
 Fanshell (Cyprogenia stegaria)
 Appalachian monkeyface (Quadrula sparsa)
 Cumberland monkeyface (Quadrula intermedia)
 Pink mucket (Lampsilis abrupta)
 Oyster mussel (Epioblasma capsaeformis)
 Birdwing pearlymussel (Lemiox rimosus)
 Cracking pearly mussel (Hemistena lata)
 Dromedary pearly mussel (Dromus dromas)
 Green blossom pearlymussel (Epioblasma torulosa gubernaculum)
 Littlewing pearlymussel (Pegias fabula)
 Fine-rayed pigtoe (Fusconaia cuneolus)
 Rough pigtoe (Pleurobema plenum)
 Shiny pigtoe (Fusconaia cor)
 Rough rabbitsfoot (Quadrula cylindrica strigillata)
 Tan riffleshell (Epioblasma florentina walkeri)
 James River spinymussel (Pleurobema collina)
 Dwarf wedgemussel (Alasmidonta heterodon)

Plants
 Sensitive joint-vetch (Aeschynomene virginica)
 Shale barren rock-cress (Arabis serotina)
 Virginia round-leaf birch (Betula uber)
 Small-anthered bittercress (Cardamine micranthera)
 Smooth purple coneflower (Echinacea laevigata)
 Virginia sneezeweed (Helenium virginicum)
 Swamp pink (Helonias bullata)
 Peter's mountain mallow (Iliamna corei)
 Small whorled pogonia (Isotria medeoloides)
 Eastern prairie fringed orchid (Platanthera leucophaea)
 Michaux's sumac (Rhus michauxii)
 American chaffseed (Schwalbea americana)
 Northeastern bulrush (Scirpus ancistrochaetus)
 Virginia spiraea (Spiraea virginiana)

References
USFWS Threatened and Endangered Species System (TESS) for Virginia

Lists of fauna of Virginia
Virginia
Virginia
Virginia